The Mystery of Dr. Fu-Manchu (1913) is the first novel in the Dr. Fu Manchu (sometimes "Fu-Manchu") series by Sax Rohmer. It collates various short stories that were published the preceding year. The novel was also published in the U.S. under the title The Insidious Dr. Fu-Manchu and was adapted into the film The Mysterious Dr. Fu Manchu.

Plot summary
Dr. Petrie is surprised by a late night visitor, "a tall, lean ... square cut ... sun baked" man who turns out to be his good friend (ex-Assistant Commissioner Sir Denis) Nayland Smith of Burma, formerly of Scotland Yard, who has come directly from Burma. We then learn that various men associated with India are the target of assassination by the Chinese master criminal Dr. Fu Manchu, who seems to have been active in Burma (as distinct from India), in places such as Rangoon, Prome, Moulmein and the "Upper Irrawaddy" and who comes to England with dacoits and thugs.

Fu Manchu is pursued from the opium dens of Limehouse in the East End of London to various country estates. We learn that Dr. Fu Manchu is a leading member not of "old China", the Mandarin class of the Manchu dynasty, or "young China", a new generation of "youthful and unbalanced reformers" with "western polish" – but a "Third Party". Nayland Smith is outwitted several times by Fu Manchu and thus he reflects more the narrow escapes of the later Bulldog Drummond rather than the "logical" superior approach of the earlier Sherlock Holmes.

Fu Manchu is a master poisoner and chemist, a cunning member of the Yellow Peril, "the greatest genius which the powers of evil have put on the earth for centuries", though his mission is not exactly clear at this stage. He appears to be trying to capture and take back to China the best engineers of Europe for some larger criminal purpose.

By the end of the book, Fu Manchu's slave girl Karamaneh, a beautiful Arab woman, apparently now in love with Dr Petrie, and her brother Aziz are freed from Fu Manchu's captivity, and Inspector Weymouth, driven mad by an injection of serum from Fu Manchu, is restored to sanity by Fu Manchu, who appears to have escaped from a fire which destroys the house that he had previously entered.

External links 

 
 
 

1913 British novels
Novels by Sax Rohmer
British crime novels
Methuen Publishing books
British novels adapted into films
Fu Manchu
Novels set in London